Naane Bhagyavati (Kannada: ನಾನೇ ಭಾಗ್ಯವತಿ) is a 1968 Indian Kannada film, directed by T. V. Singh Thakur and produced by M. Sampath. The film stars Kalyan Kumar, Udaykumar, Mynavathi and Bharathi in the lead roles. The film has musical score by T. G. Lingappa.

Cast
Kalyan Kumar
Udaykumar
Mynavathi
Bharathi
Narasimharaju

References

1968 films
1960s Kannada-language films